Anatomy of Violence is a Canadian drama film which premiered at the 2016 Toronto International Film Festival. Directed by Toronto-based filmmaker Deepa Mehta, the film explores the root causes leading up to the 2012 Delhi gang rape incident.

The film's script was created by a group of actors including Vansh Bhardwaj, Tia Bhatia, Janki Bisht and Seema Biswas, through improvisational exercises based on the relatively few snippets of known information about the perpetrators of the attack. Mehta chose to pursue a significant departure from her usual filmmaking style, in part because of the uncharacteristically poor reviews that greeted her previous film Beeba Boys.

Plot 
In New Delhi in 2012, a group of six guys raped a young woman and beat her male friend up in a moving bus. On a fictitious reenactment of the perpetrators' life, eleven actors worked together.

Cast 

 Vansh Bhardwaj
 Janki Bisht
 Mukti Ravi Das
 Ramanjit Kaur
 Jagjeet Sandhu
 Tia Bhatia
 Seema Biswas
 Suman Jha
 Mahesh Saini
 Zorawar Shukla

Awards

Reception 

 Mehta's documentary approach eventually catches up with actual broadcast material, but not enough to excuse the irresponsible use of point-and-shoot cameras that flattens the film's narrative and visual richness.
 Formally and philosophically, Anatomy of Violence is the biggest gamble of Mehta's career since it foresees uncharted territory for cinema. Is it a docudrama, mockumentary, hybrid, or true crime film? All of these and none of them make up the anatomy of violence. It's Mehta-fiction, to be precise.

References

External links

2016 films
2010s Hindi-language films
Canadian drama films
Films directed by Deepa Mehta
2010s Canadian films